Rajani Kantha is a 2013 Indian romantic drama film in the Kannada language directed by Pradeep Raj and produced by K. Manju. The film stars Duniya Vijay, playing dual roles along with Aindrita Ray in the lead roles.It is remake of Korean film My Brother (2004) The film's music is composed by Arjun Janya and the cinematography is by Giri.

Plot
Actor Duniya Vijay plays a double role Rajani and Kantha with one of the characters is born with a cleft palate. The film's plot lies in how people with the condition deal with the jibes that come their way and emerge stronger.

Cast
 Duniya Vijay as Rajani and Kantha
 Aindrita Ray as Priya
 Rekha
 Bullet Prakash
 Jasper
 Chikkanna

Production

Launch
The film production went on floors from October 2011 at the Kanteerava Studios in Bangalore. Celebrated Tamil actor Rajinikanth's close aid Rao Bahaddur formally launched the film's proceedings on behalf of the star.

Soundtrack

Reception

Critical response 

Srikanth Srinivasa of Rediff gave the film a rating of two and a half out of five stars and wrote "Rajni Kantha is for Duniya Vijay's fans" praising Vijay's performance as Rajni in the film. A critic from The Times of India scored the film at 3 out of 5 stars and says "Vijay for his excellent performance in a double role, particularly Rajani with speech defect. Aindrita Ray has given life to her role with a splendid performance. Music by Arjun Janya has some catchy tunes. Camera by R Giri is eye catching". A Shardhha of The New Indian Express wrote "key. On the whole, the ingredients never catch fire in the lifeless script. Arjun Janya's music is good but is lost in the story and there is nothing to rave about Giri's cinematography. The Verdict: It is hard to swallow particularly in an era of diminishing expectations". A critic from News18 India wrote "The music of the film by Arjun Janya is melodious, and cinematography by R Giri is also average. All in all the film lacks a good narrative and is a waste of effort". B S Srivani from Deccan Herald wrote "Arjun Janya who whips up frothy tunes and dream concoctions for the mass and class alike. A little more homework would do wonders for the director and his hero, it must be said. However, Rajini Kantha also sends out a message: Any kind of publicity cannot always be ‘good’ publicity".

References

2013 films
2010s Kannada-language films
Indian action films
Films set in Bangalore
Films scored by Arjun Janya
2013 action films
Films directed by Pradeep Raj